Super Trucks (known in North America as Super Trucks Racing) is a racing video game developed and published by Jester Interactive exclusively for PlayStation 2. All drivers and sponsor information are based on the 2001 season of the Super Trucks racing series.

According to the European box art, the game compares itself to TOCA on steroids. However, the North American box art is considered to be a simplified version of the box art seen in Europe. All visual effects and reviews are absent in the North American release and the ESRB rating is shown instead of the ELSPA rating. The theme song used at the opening title is "Bug" and is sung in a heavy metal-style by the band Feeder.

Gameplay
While the player's truck has unlimited gasoline, the player must maintain the temperature of the truck's brakes by cooling them with water. An option in the menu can be toggled so this task can either be done manually or automatically by the game. Since there is a  limited amount of water available to cool the brakes, even automatic brake cooling does not guarantee that the brakes will remain cool in longer races or practice sessions.

These specialized trucks are eighteen wheelers that are modified for racing on road courses; a large majority of these courses are located in Europe (including the Circuit Paul Armagnac in Nogaro, France). Formula One-like physics and turning dominate the tracks. Darlington Raceway (referred to in-game as "Darlington Autodrome" for no apparent reason) is considered to be one of the few North American courses in the game. However, it uses right as well as left turns like a road course instead of the standard oval used for NASCAR racing. All the real-world drivers included in the game are European in origin. Although the pit lane can be seen while driving through the start/finish line, the entrance to the pit lane is blocked and pit stops are not permitted in any mode of the game.

All manufacturers which competed in the 2001 European Truck Racing Championship are represented, apart from Mercedes-Benz, whose drivers appear in the game as part of an unlicensed "Moto LKW" racing team. This is due to Mercedes-Benz's then-ongoing relationship with game developer Synetic GmbH, who produced Mercedes-Benz Truck Racing in 2000, and would later produce Mercedes-Benz World Racing in 2003.

Gameplay modes

Reception

The game received "average" reviews according to the review aggregation website Metacritic. In Japan, where the game was ported and published by Success, also under the name , on 18 December 2003, Famitsu gave it a score of 25 out of 40.

References

External links
 

2002 video games
PlayStation 2 games
PlayStation 2-only games
Racing video games set in the United States
Sports video games set in France
Sports video games set in Germany
Success (company) games
Truck racing video games
Multiplayer and single-player video games
Video games developed in the United Kingdom
XS Games games
Jester Interactive games